Foucarmont is a commune in the Seine-Maritime department in the Normandy region in northern France.

Geography
The A28 autoroute passes within the borders of the commune.

Population

Places of interest
 The twentieth century church of St.Martin.
 The remains of a 12th-century abbey.

See also
Communes of the Seine-Maritime department

References

Communes of Seine-Maritime